Palitha Perera (also known as Kuruppuge Palitha Chandrasiri Perera) is a well known cricket commentator and media personality in Sri Lanka.

Early life and education
Palitha who was born 3 September 1942 in Nugegoda received his education from Nalanda College, Colombo. Palitha also represented Nalanda for 32nd Ananda-Nalanda big match.

Career
Palitha holds the distinction of having been the inaugural announcer on two Sri Lankan TV channels – Rupavahini (15 February 1982) and TNL TV (21 July 1993).

He was also former Deputy Director General (Commercial) of Sri Lanka Rupavahini Corporation, former Director of Sinhala Service Sri Lanka Broadcasting Corporation.

Palitha Perera completed 50 years of his Sinhala cricket commentary on 3 March 2013 at SSC Colombo. On 11 December 2020, he was honored with the Gold Lifetime Achievement award at the 'Sabuddhi Sports Literary Awards'.

References

Sources
 

 By Nalaka Gunawardene 

Sri Lankan cricket commentators
Sri Lankan radio personalities
Sri Lankan Buddhists
Alumni of Nalanda College, Colombo
Living people
People from Western Province, Sri Lanka
1942 births